The men's 25 metre rapid fire pistol shooting event at the 2015 Pan American Games will be held between the 14 and 15 of July at the Pan Am Shooting Centre in Innisfil.

The event consisted of two rounds: a qualifier and a final. In the qualifier, each shooter fired 60 shots with a pistol at 25 metres distance. Scores for each shot were in increments of 1, with a maximum score of 10. Targets were presented in series of 5. Each shooter was presented with 12 series, and had a sharply limited time to complete each. Four of the series had to be completed in 8 seconds apiece, four more within 6 seconds, and four within 4 seconds.

The top 6 shooters in the qualifying round moved on to the final round. There, they fired an additional 20 shots. These shots scored in increments of .1, with a maximum score of 10.9. They were presented in four series of 5 shots each, with each series being limited to 4 seconds to make all five shots. The total score from all 80 shots was used to determine final ranking.

The winners of all fifteen events, along with the runner up in the men's air rifle, skeet, trap and both women's rifle events will qualify for the 2016 Summer Olympics in Rio de Janeiro, Brazil (granted the athlete has not yet earned a quota for their country).

Schedule
All times are Central Standard Time (UTC-6).

Results

Qualification round

Final

References

Shooting at the 2015 Pan American Games